The Best of Vince Gill  is the first compilation album by Vince Gill, released in 1989. This album was certified Platinum by the RIAA on February 1, 1995.

Track listing

Track information and credits adapted from Discogs and AllMusic, then verified from the album's liner notes.

Musicians
Backing Vocals – Bonnie Raitt, Emmylou Harris, Rodney Crowell, Rosanne Cash, Sweethearts of the Rodeo

Production

Emory Gordy Jr. – Producer (Tracks 1-5)
Richard Landis – Producer (Track 6-8)
Barry Beckett – Producer (Track 9-10)
Mary Hamilton – Art Direction
Katherine DeVault Design – Design
Dennis Keeley – Photography

Certifications

References

External links
Artist Official Site
RCA Records Official Site

1989 compilation albums
Vince Gill compilation albums